John R. Knight is an Associate Professor of Pediatrics at Harvard Medical School (HMS) and the Associate Director for Medical Education at the HMS Division on Addictions. In 1999, he founded the Center for Adolescent Substance Abuse Research (CeASAR) and its companion outpatient clinic, the Adolescent Substance Abuse Program (ASAP). CeASAR and ASAP were the first programs of their kind to be located at a children’s hospital. He is best known as the clinical scientist who developed and validated the CRAFFT substance abuse screen for adolescents. In 2008 he was named the inaugural incumbent of the Boston Children’s Hospital Endowed Chair in Developmental Medicine

The CRAFFT Screening Test 
Knight and his colleagues first assessed other brief substance abuse screening tests.1-3 They then developed a new brief screener known as “CRAFFT” that was shown to be valid, reliable, developmentally appropriate for adolescents, and practical for use in busy pediatric offices.4,5 CRAFFT has since become the American Academy of Pediatrics’ recommended standard of care in its policy statements, and it is recommended in their Bright Futures health supervision visit as the alcohol and drug-use assessment.

Research
 Validity of brief alcohol screening tests among adolescents: a comparison of the AUDIT, POSIT, CAGE, and CRAFFT
Nonmedical use of prescription opioids among U.S. college students: Prevalence and correlates from a national survey
Non‐medical use of prescription stimulants among US college students: Prevalence and correlates from a national survey
Alcohol abuse and dependence among U.S. college students.
Dr. Knight in Other Media
 Interview with Drug-Free Kids
 Q&A with Dr. Knight
  7 Ways to Protect Your Teen from Alcohol and Other Drugs
 Presentation: Dazed and Confused: Medical Marijuana and the Developing Adolescent Brain 
Medical Marijuana Use For Children With Developmental Disorders May Do More Harm Than Good
Youth Substance Abuse Still a Serious Problem

Knight has contributed to the following textbooks
 Developmental Behavioral Pediatrics, 3rd Edition  
 Principles of Addiction Medicine, 5th Edition 
 The Soul of Medicine 
 Comprehensive Adolescent Health Care
Dr. Knight's Work has been cited in the following textbooks
 Guidelines for Perinatal Care (Forthcoming – Lormand) 
 Updates in Adolescent Medicine (Forthcoming – Voss)

References 

1. Knight J, Goodman E, Pulerwitz T, DuRant R. Reliabilities of short substance abuse screening tests among adolescent medical patients. Pediatrics (Journal of the Ambulatory Pediatric Association). 2000;105(4):948-953.

2. Knight J. The role of the primary care provider in preventing and treating alcohol problems in adolescents. Ambulatory Pediatrics. 2001;1(3):150-161.

3. Knight J, Goodman E, Pulerwitz T, DuRant R. Reliability of the Problem Oriented Screening Instrument for Teenagers (POSIT) in an adolescent medical clinic population. J Adolesc Health. 2001;29(2):125-130.

4. Knight JR, Shrier LA, Bravender TD, Farrell M, Vander  J, Shaffer HJ. A new brief screen for adolescent substance abuse. Arch Pediatr Adolesc Med. 1999;153(6):591-596.

5. Knight JR, Sherritt L, Shrier LA, Harris SK, Chang G. Validity of the CRAFFT substance abuse screening test among adolescent clinic patients. Arch Pediatr Adolesc Med. 2002;156(6):607-614.

Boston University College of Arts and Sciences alumni
American pediatricians
University of Vermont alumni
Harvard Medical School faculty
Year of birth missing (living people)
Living people